The People's Majlis (Rayyithunge Majilis) is the unicameral legislative body of Maldives. The Majlis has the authority to enact, amend and revise laws, as outlined in the Constitution of the Maldives. The Majlis is composed of 87 members as of 2019.

Each year on the last Thursday of February, the Majlis is opened by the President of the Maldives. During the opening ceremony, the president outlines his policies and achievements in his presidential term. The annual budget of the state is also passed by the Majlis. The working language of the Majlis is Dhivehi.

History 
A council was set up by Sultan Muhammad Shamsuddeen III to draft the constitution of the Maldives on 9 March 1931. The council completed and implemented the constitution on 22 December 1932. This constitution was the basis for the formation, of the first ever Majlis of the Maldives. The meetings of this Majlis were held in the “Hakura Ganduvaru”. The first president or the speaker of the Majlis was Al Ameer Mohammed Farid Didi. Maldives was then ruled by a sultan and the advent of the new constitution was seen as a threat to the sultanate. Thus, mobs were instigated against the 
constitution and it was publicly torn up.  Since then the constitution of the Maldives has been revised a number of times.

Construction of the parliament building
The present parliamentary building of the People's Majlis was inaugurated on 1 August 1998, with the presence of Pakistan's then-Prime Minister Nawaz Sharif. The building was built with the assistance of the Pakistani government, who provided a grant of Rs. 45 million ($4.25 million) for its construction.

Members and elections 
The constitution of the Maldives was re-written in 2008, and the composition, electorates and powers of the Majlis changed drastically. For example, after the change, Majlis had 85 seats, one from each electorate, has an elected speaker from among members, has substantially expanded powers, has been elected in multi-party elections since 2009 and generally resembles the parliament in other liberal democracies.

Two members are elected from each administrative atoll under the present constitution. Another two members are elected from the capital Male’. The president appoints 8 members to the Majlis. In the past the Majlis was fully controlled by the ruling regime but it has changed since the adoption of constitutional reforms in 2008 and the first multi party election in 2009.

The members are elected for a five-year term. Before the ending of the duration for the existing Majlis, a general election is held to elect a new Majlis. Usually a new Majlis is elected thirty days prior to the expiration of the existing Majlis.

Once elected, members begin their parliamentary responsibilities after taking the oath of office, stipulated in article 67 of the constitution. Members are guaranteed parliamentary immunity under the constitution.

Before the 2019 elections, the seat count was increased by two (to 87) after two districts in Male’ were split.

Speaker of the People's Majlis 
A speaker is elected among the Members. The speaker chairs the meetings of the Majlis, is responsible for maintaining order in the chamber and supervises the administrative affairs of the Majlis. The speaker is next in line to be the acting president in case of a vacancy in the president's position, until a new council to govern the state is elected.

A deputy speaker is also chosen to assist the speaker of the Majlis and to run the Majlis, when the Speaker is absent or is not fit to fulfill the responsibilities of the Speaker.

Speaker of the Special Majlis

Sittings of the Majlis 
The sittings of the Majlis are divided into three sessions a year. The speaker has the authority to assign the dates for the commencing and closing of the Majlis sessions. For a Majlis session to commence, the meeting should be presided by the speaker or the deputy speaker. The quorum of the Majlis is 26 and this number is required to begin a session of the Majlis. If the quorum is not present, the speaker has to adjourn the session. Most Majlis meetings are open to the public.

Committees  
There are two types of committees in the Majlis. They are the standing committees and the selected committees. There are eleven standing committees in the Majlis, which is responsible for proposing amendments to bills or matters presented to Majlis floor, researching of the proposed bills or matters presented to the Majlis. Members are elected for a period of two and a half years for the standing committees. The responsibility of the standing committees varies, depending on its purpose.

Unlike the standing committees, the selected committees are temporary and it's dissolved, once the selected purpose is over. Usually selected committees are made to investigate or research matters related to a present circumstance or an incident. All the committees are chaired by the speaker or the deputy speaker or a person appointed by the speaker. The Majlis decides the number of members to assign to each committee.

Majlis Secretariat 
The secretariat of the Majlis was established in 1971. Since then it has been the responsibility of the Secretariat to oversee and facilitate the smooth running of the Majlis. Secretariat supports the Majlis with legislative works, manages the administrative affairs and provides technical support to the members of the Majlis. A secretary general is appointed to run the Majlis secretariat. The general supervises the Majlis secretariat.

Legislative functions 
Legislative proposals are introduced to the Majlis as bills. The government or the members present the bills to the Majlis floor. Once the bill is presented, the committee stage begins and the members debate on the provisions of the bill. Members may also propose amendments or propose to pass the bill during the debate. The members also have the right to send the bill to any of the related committee for further research and deliberation. If the bill is sent to the committees then there won't be any further debate or voting on the bill, until the committee presents its final findings about the bill.

Once the committee stage is over, members cast their votes to decide whether the bill will pass or not. If an amendment is proposed to the bill, the members votes for the amendment first. When the amendments are passed the members vote on to decide the fate of the bill. Once the bill is passed, it is sent to the president within seven days for presidential assent. The president should give his decree on the bill within thirty days or return it to the Majlis for further consideration or consideration of any amendments proposed by the president.

If the bill was not returned to the Majlis by the president or even if the president did not ratify the bill within the thirty-day period, the bill is deemed to become law. If the bill is sent back to the Majlis, the members can decide to pass the bill as it was before or they can consider the presidents observations.

See also
List of legislatures by country
Politics of the Maldives

References 

 
 presidencymaldives.gov.mv
 state.gov
 directory.cpahq.org

External links
  

Government of the Maldives
Unicameral legislatures
1931 establishments in the British Empire